Asparus is a genus of moths in the subfamily Arctiinae. It contains the single species Asparus bicolor, which is found in South Africa.

References
Citations

Bibliography
Natural History Museum Lepidoptera generic names catalog

Endemic moths of South Africa
Lithosiini
Monotypic moth genera
Moths of Africa